Nikolai Nikolaievich Zlatovratsky (December 26, 1845 – December 23, 1911), was a Russian writer.

Biography
Zlatovratsky was born in Vladimir, where his father was a minor government official. His father set up a library for local people, and it was here that Zlatovratsky first became familiar with literature. He attended a gymnasium, and studied for a time at the St Petersburg Technological Institute, but had to leave for lack of money. He found a position as proof-reader at a newspaper, where he became interested in writing.

His first sketch was published in 1866. His novel Foundations (1883) was published in Annals of the Fatherland. The main subjects of his works were the peasants, and the populist intellectuals. He was a member of the Moscow literary group Sreda from its inception in 1899 until his death. He was eventually given honorary membership in the Imperial Academy of Arts. He died in Moscow in 1911.

English translations 
Old Shadows, (story), from Anthology of Russian Literature, Volume 2, Leo Wiener, G.P. Putnam's Sons, 1903. from Archive.org

References

The Cambridge history of Russian literature, Cambridge University Press, 1992.
Anthology of Russian Literature, Volume 2, Leo Wiener, G.P. Putnam's Sons, 1903.

1845 births
1911 deaths
Novelists from the Russian Empire
Male writers from the Russian Empire
Writers from the Russian Empire
Saint Petersburg State Institute of Technology alumni
Short story writers from the Russian Empire
People from Vladimir, Russia